Rivamonte Agordino is a comune (municipality) in the Province of Belluno in the Veneto Region of NE Italy.

Rivamonte Agordino borders the following municipalities: Agordo, Gosaldo, La Valle Agordina, Sedico, Sospirolo and Voltago Agordino.

Demographic evolution

References

External links
 www.agordino.bl.it

Cities and towns in Veneto